Sight is a 2008 horror film written and directed by Adam Ahlbrandt.

Plot 

Jeffrey leads a quiet existence. Living in constant fear of being labeled a psychopath, Jeffrey constructs a complex world of denial. He is haunted by the spirits of the vengeful dead, which he can see while no one else can. After meeting Dana, a beautiful young woman who shares his "sight", Jeffery finds comfort in knowing someone shares his affliction. However, his comfort is short lived as Dana suddenly goes missing and Jeffrey is left alone to find the answers.

Cast

Reception 

Bloody Disgusting gave Sight a 1½ out of 5, the website's primary criticisms of the film being the muddled plot, and the sound quality. A ½ was awarded by Steve Barton of Dread Central, who succinctly stated, "The only constructive thing I can say about this dark, dreary, time-consuming, black hole of a film is that it was less than an hour and a half long and had some okay sound design". DVD Talk's Justin Felix, who gave the film a 2½ out of 5, said, "Acting aside, Sight is ultimately a worthwhile low budget exercise in eerie mood and spectral scares, though I'm not sure it warrants repeat viewings". The film was deemed "slightly annoying" in a review for DVD Verdict written by David Johnson, who concluded his coverage of Sight with, "A well-acted horror film that relies too heavily on the jump scare and a twist ending that fails to wow, Sight probably isn't worth taking a look at".

References

External links 

 

2008 films
2000s ghost films
2008 horror films
American supernatural horror films
2008 direct-to-video films
American independent films
Direct-to-video horror films
American direct-to-video films
Films directed by Adam Ahlbrandt
Films shot in Philadelphia
2008 directorial debut films
2000s supernatural horror films
2008 independent films
American ghost films
2000s English-language films
2000s American films